Bionomics (Greek: bio = life; nomos = law) has two different meanings: 
 the first is the comprehensive study of an organism and its relation to its environment. As translated from the French word Bionomie, its first use in English was in the period of 1885-1890. Another way of expressing this word is the term currently referred to as "ecology".
 the other is an economic discipline which studies economy as a self-organized evolving ecosystem.

An example of studies of the first type is in Richard B. Selander's Bionomics, Systematics and Phylogeny of Lytta, a Genus of Blister Beetles (Coleoptera, Meloidae), Illinois Biological Monographs: number 28, 1960. 

According to some scholars, who still adhere to bionomics, it transforms many principles of traditional ecology, recognizing that Life on Earth is hierarchically organized in complex systems, acting as living entities well farther populations and communities.

When related to the territory Ignegnoli talks about Landscape Bionomics, defining Landscape as the "level of biological organization integrating complex systems of plants, animals and humans in a living Entity recognizable in a territory as characterized by suitable emerging properties in a determined spatial configuration". (Ingegnoli, 2011, 2015; Ingegnoli, Bocchi, Giglio, 2017)

Bionomics as an economic discipline is used by Igor Flor of "Bionomica, the International Bionomics Institute"

References 
   Benthos - Bionomics
 Ingegnoli V, Bocchi S, Giglio E (2017) Landscape Bionomics: a Systemic Approach to Understand and Govern Territorial Development.  WSEAS Transactions on Environment and Development, Vol.13, pp. 189-195   
 Ingegnoli V (2015) Landscape Bionomics. Biological-Integrated Landscape Ecology. Springer, Heidelberg, Milan, New York. Pp. XXIV + 431 
 Ingegnoli, V. (2011). Bionomia del paesaggio. L’ecologia del paesaggio biologico-integrata per la formazione di un “medico” dei sistemi ecologici. Springer-Verlag, Milano, pp. XX+340.

External link 
 Website of "Bionomica"
Ecology

zh:生态学